Remnant or remnants may refer to:

Religion
 Remnant (Bible), a recurring theme in the Bible
 Remnant (Seventh-day Adventist belief), the remnant theme in the Seventh-day Adventist Church
 The Remnant (newspaper), a traditional Catholic newspaper

Entertainment

Music
 The Remnant, former name of Becoming the Archetype, an American Christian metal band
 The Remnant, a 2004 album by The Remnant
 Remnants, a 2016 album by LeAnn Rimes
 "Remnant", a song by Erra from their 2021 self-titled album
 "Remnants", a song by Disturbed from the 2010 album Asylum
 REMNANTS an album by Toronto electronic musician Roam

Other entertainment
 Remnant (comics), a character from the Squadron Supreme comic books
 The Remnant (novel), 10th book in the Left Behind series
 Remnants (Alias episode), 2003 episode of Alias
 Remnants (film), 2014 American apocalyptic thriller directed by Peter Engert
 Remnants (novel series), a series of science fiction books written by K. A. Applegate
 Remnants (Stargate Atlantis), 2008 episode of Stargate Atlantis
 Remnants, a fictional variety of corrupted souls from the Skulduggery Pleasant book series
 Remnant: From the Ashes an action role-playing third person shooter developed by Gunfire Games

People
 Baron Remnant, a title in the Peerage of the United Kingdom
 Ernest Remnant, an English first-class cricketer
 George Remnant, an English first-class cricketer
 James Remnant, 1st Baron Remnant, British Conservative politician
 Peter Remnant, British Conservative politician
 Robert Remnant, 2nd Baron Remnant, English first-class and minor counties cricketer
 Scott James Remnant, an American software engineer

Other
 Nova remnant, material left behind by explosive ejections of supernovae
 Remnant cholesterol, all plasma cholesterol that is not LDL cholesterol or HDL cholesterol
 Remnant Media, a British company which published a variety of pornographic magazines
 Remnants F.C., a 19th-century amateur football club in England
 Supernova remnant, the structure resulting from the explosion of a star in a supernova
 Remnant (tropical cyclone), the storm system resulting from when a tropical cyclone or hurricane dissipates

See also 
 Remnant church (disambiguation)
 Remnants of War (album), 1986 album by Helstar
 The Remnant Trust, an educational foundation located at Texas Tech University, Lubbock, Texas